Abel Oluyemi Ajibodu is an Anglican bishop in Nigeria: he is the current Bishop of Ile-Oluji.

He has previously served as an Archdeacon and a Dean.

He was consecrated as Bishop of Ile-Oluji in July 2017 at the Archbishop Vining Memorial Church Cathedral in Ikeja.

Notes

Living people
Anglican bishops of Ile-Oluji
21st-century Anglican bishops in Nigeria
Anglican deans in Africa
Year of birth missing (living people)
Church of Nigeria archdeacons